The Hawkei is a light four-wheel-drive protected mobility vehicle originally designed to meet an Australian Defence Force (ADF) requirement for a light armoured patrol vehicle to replace some of its Land Rover Perentie variants. The Hawkei is a highly mobile, highly protected, 7-tonne vehicle, with inbuilt systems to allow it to be used as a fighting platform. It has been developed with Vehicle Electronic Architecture to be mission system ready. It is intended to undertake a range of mission profiles, including troop movement, command and control, electronic warfare, liaison, surveillance and reconnaissance. Prime contractors include: Thales Australia, Boeing Australia, Plasan (Israel) and PAC Group. In October 2015, the Australian Government announced the purchase of 1,100 Hawkei vehicles and more than 1,000 companion trailers from Thales Australia.

History
As part of a wider project to replace the ADF's fleet of operational support vehicles, Project Land 121 Phase 4 – Protected Mobility Vehicle (Light) or PMV-L, is a requirement for up to 1,300 specialised light armoured vehicles to replace some of the in-service Land Rovers. Key criteria for the project included: off-road mobility, integrated vehicle electronic architecture, substantial payloads, high levels of protection against land mines, improvised explosive devices and ballistic weapons, while being light enough to be airlifted by military helicopters.  The three options considered as part of the project were:
Option 1, Joint Light Tactical Vehicle (JLTV) Program - align the PMV-L requirement to the United States JLTV program to replace its fleet of High Mobility Multipurpose Wheeled Vehicle or 'Humvee' (awarded 25 August 2015 to Oshkosh offering L-ATV);
Option 2, Manufactured and Supported in Australia (MSA); and
Option 3, Market available – pursuit of this option is subject to Australian Government decisions on Options 1 and 2.

Competitors for the MSA option included the combat-proven MOWAG Eagle IV from General Dynamics Land Systems; the British military then selected Ocelot from Force Protection; and the Hawkei offering from Thales Australia. The JLTV option included entries from BAE Systems/Navistar, AM General/General Dynamics and Lockheed Martin.

In December 2011 the Australian Department of Defence announced Hawkei as the preferred vehicle for further development and testing under the MSA option.

In October 2015, Prime Minister Malcolm Turnbull and Minister for Defence Marise Payne announced the purchase of 1,100 Hawkei vehicles and trailers at a cost of $1.3 billion with the Hawkei to be manufactured at Thales's facility in Bendigo. The purchase includes 1058 trailers designed by Schutt Industries and manufactured by Thales at their facility in Eagle Farm. Two variants of the Hawkei will be purchased: a 4-door variant and a 2-door utility variant. The 4-door variant will be able to be configured using a mission-kit for three roles: Command, Liaison and Reconnaissance. 635 4-door variants and 465 2-door variants will be purchased.

In September 2018, the Australian National Audit Office released a report which criticised aspects of the Hawkei project. The report judged that Australia should have remained in the JLTV program to provide competition for the Hawkei procurement and that the Department of Defence had not kept ministers fully informed about the Hawkei program. This included not providing ministers with a study which found that there were few benefits from building the vehicles in Australia. The ANAO was unable to publish some elements of the audit after Attorney General Christian Porter ruled that publishing it would compromise national security. Thales had taken legal action earlier in the year seeking to have material removed from the report. Some of the suppressed elements of the report were released in 2021 following a freedom of information request, and included material stating that the Department of Defence had been unable to demonstrate that the Hawkei represented value for money compared to the JLTV.

In December 2018, the Hawkei faced reliability issues following a demonstration test conducted on 19 November 2018, delaying full-rate production.

In September 2020, Defence Minister Linda Reynolds and Defence Industry Minister Melissa Price announced that the Hawkei would enter full-rate production at Thales's facility in Bendigo at approximately 50 vehicles per month.

In March 2022, it was reported that delivery of the vehicle had been delayed due to issues with their brakes, only 3 months after full production had been started.

Variants
All variants use the same four wheeled platform.

4 door
Dual cab manned by a crew of four to six, weapons system options including up to 12.7mm guns or 40mm grenade systems in various mounts with a remote operated option.

2 door

Single-extended cab with a flat-bed cargo area measuring; L:  x W: . The load bed is designed to accommodate four 1000mm × 1200mm (40" x 48") NATO standard military pallets or a single tricon (one-third ISO 20 ft) container.

Proposed variants

Border Protection
Dual cab manned by a crew of four to six, various equipment options including force protection radar, surveillance and communications systems.

Special Operations Vehicle
Dual cab manned by a crew of four to six with up to three weapon systems:
 Front co-driver swing mount;
 Roof mounted manual gunring or remote weapon station; and/or
 Rear-facing swing mount.
Options included full doors, half doors, windscreen and scalable racking system for payload.

Etymology
The Hawkei is named after Acanthophis hawkei, a species of death adder. In turn, the snake is named after former Prime Minister of Australia Bob Hawke.

Operators

  - Australian Army: 260 Hawkei delivered as of June 2021 (1,100 ordered).

Potential operators
  - On August 5, 2022, it was reported in Japan that Mitsubishi Heavy Industries may manufacture the Hawkei under licence from Thales in case the contract is awarded to them for the JGSDF.
  - In November 2017, it was reported that the Hawkei was being considered by Poland as part of a modernisation of the country's military. This could result in an initial purchase of 50 vehicles, and as many as 700 over the long term. In September 2020, the Hawkei was announced as one of four vehicles to qualify for the Polish competition.
  - On September 15, 2022, it was reported in Australia that the Ukrainian ambassador to Australia requested 30 Hawkei vehicles from the Australian Defence Minister to complement their existing fleet of Bushmasters.

See also
List of armoured fighting vehicles by country

References

External links

 Hawkei - official Hawkei website.
 Datasheet - Command - official Hawkei brochure.
 Datasheet - Utility - official Hawkei brochure.
 Thales Protected Mobility - official manufacturer dedicated website.

Military light utility vehicles
Armoured cars
Off-road vehicles
Armoured fighting vehicles of Australia
Military trucks
Military vehicles introduced in the 2010s